Bulanliq (also Romanized as Būlānlīq; also known as Bolānlīq) is a village in Qezel Uzan Rural District, in the Central District of Meyaneh County, East Azerbaijan Province, Iran. At the 2006 census, its population was 456, in 84 families.

References 

Populated places in Meyaneh County